The 2003 European Judo Championships were the 14th edition of the European Judo Championships, and were held in Düsseldorf, Germany from 16 May to 18 May 2003.

Medal overview

Men

Women

Medals table

Results overview

Men

60 kg

66 kg

73 kg

81 kg

90 kg

100 kg

+100 kg

Open class

Women

48 kg

52 kg

57 kg

63 kg

70 kg

78 kg

+78 kg

Open class

External links
 

 
E
Judo Championships
European Judo Championships
International sports competitions hosted by Germany
Sports competitions in Düsseldorf
Judo competitions in Germany
May 2003 sports events in Europe
2000s in Düsseldorf